Nagini may refer to:

 Nāginī, a female member of the Naga, a class of semi-divine snakes in Indian religion and mythology
 Nagini (Harry Potter), a snake in the Harry Potter series
 Nagini mazonense, an extinct species of amniote

See also
 Nagin (disambiguation)
 Nagina (disambiguation)
 Naga (disambiguation)
 Ichchadhari Naagin, shape-shifting Nāgās in Indian folklore
 Nagaina, a spider genus of the family Salticidae (jumping spiders)
 Nagaina, a character in Rudyard Kipling's Rikki-Tikki-Tavi